The 2021–22 Washington State Cougars men's basketball team represents Washington State University during the 2021–22 NCAA Division I men's basketball season. The team is led by third-year head coach Kyle Smith. The Cougars play their home games at the Beasley Coliseum in Pullman, Washington as members in the Pac-12 Conference.

Previous season
The Cougars finished the 2019–20 season 14–13, 7–12 in Pac-12 play to finish in 10th place. They lost in the first round to Arizona State of the Pac-12 tournament.

Offseason

Departures

Incoming transfers

2021 recruiting class

Roster

Schedule and results

|-
!colspan=9 style=| Regular season

|-
!colspan=9 style=| Pac-12 Tournament

|-
!colspan=9 style=| NIT

Source:

References

Washington State
Washington State Cougars men's basketball seasons
Washington State
Washington State
Washington State